National Highway 126A, commonly referred to as NH 126A is a national highway in India. It is a secondary route of National Highway 26.  NH-126A runs in the state of Odisha in India.

Route 
NH126A connects Barapali, Rampur, Singhijuba, Bisalpalii, Nagapalli and Sonepur in the state of Odisha.

Junctions  

  Terminal near Barapali.
  Terminal near Sonapur.

See also 
 List of National Highways in India
 List of National Highways in India by state

References

External links 

 NH 126A on OpenStreetMap

National highways in India
National Highways in Odisha